The hjärta & smärta EP (Swedish for The Heart & Pain EP) is an EP by Swedish rock band Kent, released in 2005. The production of the EP was kept secret and it was announced just one month before its release.  The CD and cover slip, in contrast to Kent's previous release Du & jag döden, are both almost completely white. As of 2007, the EP had sold 40,000 copies.

Track listing

Charts

References 

Kent (band) albums
2005 debut EPs
Number-one singles in Sweden